Helmut von Bockelberg (October 20, 1911 – March 29, 1996) was a German politician of the Christian Democratic Union (CDU) and former member of the German Bundestag.

Life 
Bockelberg had been a member of the CDU since 1958. From 1960 to 1970, he was chairman of the CDU district association of Bielefeld. Bockelberg, who had previously been a member of the Bielefeld district council from 1958 to 1964, was elected to the German Bundestag in the 1969 federal elections via the North Rhine-Westphalia CDU state list, to which he belonged until 1976.

Literature

References

1911 births
1996 deaths
Members of the Bundestag for North Rhine-Westphalia
Members of the Bundestag 1972–1976
Members of the Bundestag 1969–1972
Members of the Bundestag for the Christian Democratic Union of Germany